Ger Halligan was a Gaelic football manager associated with the Wexford county team, who also served as a selector. He was attached to the Sarsfields club. He succeeded Jo Jo Barrett as Wexford manager in 1999.

References

Gaelic football managers
Gaelic football selectors
Year of birth missing (living people)
Living people